Somtum is a 2008 Thai martial arts film starring Nathan Jones as a tourist in Pattaya who is drugged, robbed and left penniless. Befriended by two young girls, one of whom is a muay Thai kickboxing champion, he is taken to their family restaurant where he is fed some spicy som tam. His adverse reaction leads to the destruction of the restaurant and he vows to raise the money to rebuild it.

Cast
Nathan Jones as Barney Emerald
Sasisa Jindamanee as Dokya
Nawarat Techarathanaprasert as Katen
Dan Chupong as Lieutenant Pong
Kessarin Ektawatkul as Papaya Vendor
Conan Stevens as Jojo
Philip Hersh as Sports Announcer (Voice)
Chatchapol Kulsiriwutichai as Passport Fraud Gang
Sarawut Komsorn as Passport Fraud Gang
Tanavit Wongsuwan as Passport Fraud Gang

External links

2008 films
Thai martial arts films
Muay Thai films
Thai Muay Thai films
Martial arts tournament films
Films set in Pattaya